McLaren Automotive (formerly known as McLaren Cars) is a British luxury automotive manufacturer based at the McLaren Technology Centre in Woking, England. The main products of the company are supercars, which are produced in-house in designated production facilities. In July 2017, McLaren Automotive became a wholly owned subsidiary of the wider McLaren Group.

History

Origin and founder
McLaren Automotive replaced McLaren Cars in 2010. McLaren Cars had been founded in 1985 and released the McLaren F1 in 1992. Between 1994 and 2010, McLaren Cars was registered as a 'dormant company', before the founding of McLaren Automotive in 2010. The new company was originally separate from the existing McLaren companies to enable investment in the new venture, but was brought together in July 2017 after Ron Dennis sold his shares in McLaren Automotive and McLaren Group.

McLaren's Formula One founder Bruce McLaren was born in Auckland, New Zealand in 1937, and learned about cars and engineering at his parents' service station and workshop there. By 15, he had entered a local hillclimb in an Austin 7 Ulster, winning his first race in the car. In 1958, McLaren arrived in the United Kingdom with the 'Driver to Europe' scheme, intended to help Australian and New Zealand racers to compete in Europe. His mentor, Jack Brabham, introduced him to Cooper Cars, a small team based in Surbiton, Surrey. Auspiciously starting his Formula One career in 1958, McLaren joined the Formula One team a year later. That same year, he won the US Grand Prix at age 22, making him the youngest Grand Prix winner to that date. He stayed with Cooper for a further seven years, winning three more Grands Prix and other races, driving for Jaguar and Aston Martin, and winning the 24 Hours of Le Mans in 1966 with Ford.

McLaren founded Bruce McLaren Motor Racing in 1963. A year later, the company built the first true McLaren race car – the M1 (24 customer cars were produced by Elva). Its successor, the M1B, allowed McLaren into the Can-Am championship, where it dominated with 43 victories, almost three times more than rival Porsche. In 1965, the first McLaren Formula One car, the M2B, debuted at the Monaco Grand Prix.

After his victories and time in the F3, McLaren was designing and testing a prototype M6GT-registered OBH 500H, a light sports car with an estimated top speed of 165 mph and zero to 100 mph time of eight seconds. However, McLaren died in a car accident in 1970 before the prototype could be completed.

Merging, spinoff and growth 
In 1980, the company merged with Ron Dennis’ Project 4 Racing team. The merger brought back designer John Barnard, who was interested in using carbon fibre composite. Carbon fibre was already used in aerospace applications but had never been applied to a complete racing car monocoque. McLaren pioneered the use of carbon fibre in motor racing with its new car, the MP4/1, bringing new levels of rigidity and driver safety to Formula 1. In August 1988, Dennis, Team Principal and Gordon Murray started to develop a new car and in 1992, the F1 was launched with a total production run of just 106 units.

Following a brief collaboration with Mercedes-Benz for the SLR McLaren, McLaren Automotive was re-launched as a standalone manufacturer in 2010, spinning off McLaren Racing. The company launched the 12C in 2011 and the Spider model in 2012. The limited-run P1 went into production in 2013 and ended in 2015. After introducing a business plan to release a car or model every year, the company unveiled the 650S in Coupé and Spider models in 2014, and unveiled the new Sports Series range comprising the McLaren 570S and 540C in 2015. The company debuted a car for children, the P1TM, after the P1, in September 2016 and announced the same month that they are developing a powerful battery for Formula E. In October 2016, councillors were reported to be looking at a proposition for land opposite the McLaren Technology Centre for construction and announced the "Pure McLaren Arctic Experience" the same month, an event where a participant was trained to drive a 570S in the Arctic Circle.

Headquarters and facilities 
McLaren Automotive is based at the McLaren Technology Centre, alongside the rest of the McLaren Group, and at the adjacent McLaren Production Centre. The two facilities are connected by a subterranean walkway, with the MPC built partially underground to minimise its presence.

In 2017 McLaren announced the construction of the £50m McLaren Composites Technology Centre (MCTC) at the Advanced Manufacturing Park in Rotherham. The facility will build carbon fibre chassis for future McLaren road cars. The facility aims to give McLaren greater control over the manufacture of composite tubs, providing an opportunity to increase the pace of the design and development of the tubs. Full production will begin at the MCTC by 2020. The MCTC was officially opened by The Duke of Cambridge, Duchess of Cambridge, and the Crown Prince of Bahrain in November 2018.

Products and strategy 
McLaren's first purpose-built road car was the F1, based on a concept developed by Gordon Murray that he convinced Ron Dennis to back. McLaren Cars went into hibernation following the completion of the F1's production run, and McLaren didn't return to the production car market until launching McLaren Automotive in 2010, just prior to the release of the MP4-12C (eventually simplified to just 12C) in 2011.

McLaren launched its current three-tier product structure in 2015, dividing their range of cars into the Sports, Super, and Ultimate Series. Cars in the Sports and Super Series are given names based on the car's power output in PS, followed by a model designation (C for club, S for sport, GT for grand tourer and LT for longtail). The entry-level Sports Series consists of the 570S, 570S Spider, 570GT, 540C, 600LT and 600LT Spider. The Super Series, considered to be McLaren's core model range, originally included the 650S, 625C, and 675LT. These were replaced with the 720S in 2017 (and 720S Spider in 2018). The high-end Ultimate Series was led by the P1 and P1 GTR, now it includes the Senna, Senna GTR and the upcoming Speedtail, intended to be the successor to the original F1. The F1 and 12C were retroactively included in the Ultimate and Super Series, respectively.

Models 
Bold text signifies a model is currently being produced.

Collaborations

Mercedes-Benz SLR McLaren 

In 1999, McLaren agreed to design and manufacture the SLR (also known as P7) in conjunction with Mercedes-Benz. DaimlerChrysler was the engine supplier to McLaren Racing through its Formula One partner Mercedes-Benz division. The final stages of production of the Mercedes-Benz SLR McLaren took place at a designated assembly facility at the McLaren Technology Centre.

It can accelerate from 0 to 60 mph (0–97 km/h) in 3.8 seconds and 0 to 100 mph (0–161 km/h) in 6.3 seconds.

In 2006, the Mercedes-Benz McLaren SLR 722 Edition was announced. A new suspension is used with 19-inch (480 mm) light-alloy wheels, a stiffer damper configuration and 0.4 inches (10 mm) lower body.

In 2007, the Mercedes-Benz McLaren SLR Convertible was announced, which has been available from late 2007. The car uses the same supercharged 5.5 litre V8 that is in the coupé.

A limited edition called the SLR Stirling Moss was introduced. The car was the final SLR produced and a tribute to Stirling Moss. Beneath the scissor-doors is a plaque with Moss' signature on it.

Unreleased vehicles 
The partnership between Mercedes-Benz and McLaren resulted in three further cars being proposed. The P9 was to be a mid-engined baby supercar with a less expensive model, with the P8 (or "SLS") competing with cars such as the Ferrari F430, Bentley Continental GT, and Aston Martin DB9. Both cars were to be powered by naturally aspirated V8 engines. The P10 would have been an SLR replacement.

All three cars were aborted in 2005, with Mercedes rumoured to have considered the projects simply too costly to turn into a solid business case, although Mercedes' AMG subsidiary produced a flagship sports car called the Mercedes-Benz SLS AMG. The car had a naturally aspirated V8 with over 570 bhp (430 kW; 580 PS); however, it is not thought to be related to the P8 project.

Divisions

McLaren GT 
McLaren GT is the GT racing arm of McLaren Automotive, established in 2011 to develop, build and support all McLaren track and GT race activities. The division is currently responsible for the design, development and production of the 720S GT3 and 570S GT4, along with the new Artura GT4 and Artura Trophy.

The first car developed by McLaren GT was the 12C GT3, which was launched in 2011, and following a development year, 25 examples were delivered to customers for racing throughout Europe in 2012. The debut season saw 13 McLaren GT customer teams visit 14 countries and between them, the teams claimed a total of 19 race victories in the FIA GT1 World Championship, Blancpain Endurance Series, Barcelona 24hours, British GT, City Challenge Baku, FFSA French GT and GT Cup.

A total of 19 McLaren GT customer teams contested the 2013 season, entering 108 races across 15 championships globally. In total, the teams claimed 27 pole positions, 23 victories, a further 39 podium finishes and three championship titles.

Following the successful 2013 season, McLaren GT expanded its customer support with the competitive debut for the 12C GT3 car in the Pirelli World Challenge championship in North America.

Around 15 examples of the 650S GT3 made race debuts during the 2015 race season, claiming a number of victories. Most notably the McLaren GT customer racing team Von Ryan Racing took victory at the Blancpain Endurance Series at Silverstone, marking the first win in the Blancpain Endurance Series for the 650S GT3 in its debut competitive season.

The 650S GT3 was the dominant GT car in 2016. In February, Australian team Tekno Autosports won the 2016 Liqui Moly Bathurst 12 Hour at the Mount Panorama Circuit in Australia with drivers Álvaro Parente, Shane van Gisbergen and Jonathon Webb. In the 2016 Blancpain GT Series Endurance Cup, British team Garage 59 won the 3 Hours of Monza and the 1000 km on their way to the title with their team of van Gisbergen, Rob Bell and Côme Ledogar.

McLaren Special Operations 
McLaren Special Operations is McLaren's bespoke division. Officially launched in 2011, MSO's origins date back over 20 years, as the division grew out of the McLaren Customer Care Programme that was set up in the early 1990s to service, maintain and personalise the McLaren F1 for owners.

References

External links

 McLaren Automotive official website
 McLaren Performance Technologies official website
 How It Works magazine article

Motor vehicle manufacturers of England
A
Car manufacturers of the United Kingdom
Luxury motor vehicle manufacturers
Sports car manufacturers
Companies based in Surrey
British companies established in 1985
Vehicle manufacturing companies established in 1985
1985 establishments in England
Car brands